Perumal  is a 2009 Tamil action film starring Sundar C, Namitha and Meenakshi. It is directed by Vincent Selva and released to negative reviews.

Plot
The movie begins in a hospital where a mafia is involved in adulterating drugs. Unfortunately, a junior doctor Alamu (Meenakshi) manages to stumble upon their antisocial act. To safeguard themselves, the gang sets out to wipe out Alamu. She meets Perumal (Sundar C), a petty thief who does the job of recovering loans for an agency. He eventually vows to protect Alamu from her distress by putting an end to the gang and their atrocities.

Cast

 Sundar C. as Perumal
 Namitha as Saroja
 Meenakshi as Dr. Alamu
 Vivek as Idithangi/Indrasena Reddy
 Kota Srinivasa Rao
 Sudheer
 Ilavarasu
 Singamuthu
 Swaminathan
 Dhamu
 Thennavan
 Cell Murugan
 Thambi Ramaiah
 T. P. Gajendran
 Crane Manohar
 Muthukaalai
 Scissor Manohar
 Kadhal Arun Kumar
 Sivanarayana Moorthy
 Kaajal Pasupathi as Idithangi's wife
 Bava Lakshmanan
 Munnar Ramesh
 Naveen
 Marthandan
 Gayathri
 Jasper
 Besant Ravi

Soundtrack

The soundtrack features five songs composed by Srikanth Deva and lyrics written by Kabilan.

Track listings:
 "Enna Enna Seyyapporae" - Sumangali (5:38)
 "Yedhaachum Sollikuvee" - Anuradha Sriram (4:27)
 "Yaen Kedutha" - Benny Dayal, Surmukhi Raman (4:40)
 "Enna Enna" - Asha Ramesh (4:43)
 "Kadhal Vaipogamae" - S. Janaki, Arivunidhi (4:03)

Reception
Indiaglitz wrote "It is a movie sure to appease action-buffs. Had Vinecent Selvah concentrated more on screenplay and ensured that more suspense elements are attached, this Perumal would have blessed his devotees ardently." Behindwoods wrote "Overall, Perumal is a potent idea gone wrong. The theme had the ability to give suspense and thrills that would have made for engaging viewing but the director has failed to sustain either of these, it does not make for interesting viewing." Rediff wrote "Apparently, the makers decided that nothing much was needed to make this into a complete movie because there's nothing else."

References

Indian action films
2000s masala films
2009 action films
2009 films
2000s Tamil-language films
Films scored by Srikanth Deva